Idwal ab Idwal (died 988), usually known as Ieuaf to distinguish him from his father Idwal Foel, was joint king of Gwynedd in northern Wales from 950 to 969. He possibly also ruled Powys for some time.

Ieuaf was a son of King Idwal the Bald. Upon his father's death in battle against the Anglo-Saxons in 942, he and his brother Iago were driven from their kingdom by their uncle Hywel Dda of Deheubarth, who took the crown for himself. On Hywel's death in 950, Ieuaf and Iago were able to drive out Hywel's sons, their cousins, at the Battle of Carno and reclaim the kingdom. However, fighting continued, with the brothers raiding as far south as Dyfed in 952 and their cousins raiding as far north as the Conwy valley in 954. The southern princes were finally defeated at the Battle of Llanrwst and chased back to Ceredigion.

Having won, the brothers then began to quarrel among themselves. Iago took Ieuaf prisoner in 969, and Ieuaf played no further role in Gwynedd. Iago ruled another decade before Ieuaf's son Hywel usurped him in 979; according to historian John Edward Lloyd, Ieuaf remained in captivity until his death in 988.

Children
 Hywel ab Ieuaf
 Cadwallon ab Ieuaf
 Meurig ab Ieuaf

References

Monarchs of Gwynedd
Monarchs of Powys
House of Aberffraw
10th-century Welsh monarchs
988 deaths
Year of birth unknown